Lubuk Pakam is a town in North Sumatra province of Indonesia and it is the seat (capital) of Deli Serdang Regency.

Controversy
The area supports large plantation for London Sumatra, whose notable claim to fame in recent years is in its confrontation with local villagers who want their land back. A leading oil palm company "PT London Sumatra", with backing from Cadbury's and Deutsche Bank, were allegedly intimidating a local community which is fighting for the return of their forest lands.

The villagers of Pergulaan have peacefully sought to regain 1.69 square kilometres of land which was stolen from them years ago to create an oil palm plantation. In June 2004 it was alleged that London Sumatra had dug a massive ditch, 6 metres deep and 4 wide, around the village to cut off the protesting villagers. The most recent reports were that militias have been sent to violently silence the villagers.

References

Populated places in North Sumatra
Regency seats of North Sumatra